ŠKF Sereď is a Slovak football team, based in the town of Sereď, that plays in the 3. Liga, the 3rd tier of Slovak football. It was founded as Sereďský športový klub in 1914. The club won the Slovak 2. Liga in 2017–18, thereby gaining promotion to Slovakia's first division.

History

Events Timeline
 28 June 1914: Founded as Sereďský Športový Klub
 1950s: Renamed TJ Slavoj Sereď
 1966: Renamed TJ Hutník Sereď
 19??: Renamed ŠKF Sereď
 2018: Renamed ŠKF iClinic Sereď for sponsorship reasons
 2020: Reverted to ŠKF Sereď
 2021: Renamed to ŠKF Orion Tip Sereď for sponsorship reasons

Promotion to Fortuna Liga
Sereď played the 2017-18 season in the second tier of the Slovak football league system. They finished the season in first place, winning the 2. liga championship and earning promotion to the Slovak Super Liga where they will play in 2018-19. In the 2021-22 season of Fortuna Liga, Sereď finished as 5th team, but despite this, they did not obtain license for the next season, because the club was missing infrastructure - stadium.

Honours

Domestic
 Slovak Second Division
  Winners (1):  2017–18 (Promoted)

Current squad 

For recent transfers, see List of Slovak football transfers summer 2021 and  List of Slovak football transfers winter 2021-22

Out on loan

Staff

Current technical staff
As of 8 March 2022

Club officials

Notable players 
Had international caps for their respective countries. Players whose name is listed in bold represented their countries while playing for Sered.
	
 Tomás Dabó
 Warsama Hassan
 Dejan Iliev
 Ľubomír Michalík
 Vahagn Militosyan
 Álvaro Pereira
 Dejan Peševski
 Peter Petráš
 Eneji Moses
 Kathon St. Hillaire
 Štefan Senecký
 Martin Šulek
 Todor Todoroski

Managers

  Dušan Radolský (1986-1987)
  Marián Süttö (2009)
  Tibor Meszlényi (2010)
  Tibor Meszlényi (2014– 2016)
  Marián Süttö (2016– 28 Jun 2017)
  Marián Šarmír (28 Jun 2017 – 2018)
  Michal Gašparík (2018 – 4 Sep 2018)
  Karel Stromšík (4 Sep 2018 – 30 May 2019)
  Slavče Vojneski (28 Jun 2019 – 12 Dec 2019)
  Roland Praj (19 Dec 2019 – 9 Feb 2020)
  Peter Lérant (9 Feb 2020 – 15 Dec 2020)
  František Šturma (29 Dec 2020 – 7 Mar 2021)
  Ján Blaháč (16 Feb 2021 – 7 Mar 2021) (car)
  Gergely Geri (8 Mar 2021 – 2 June 2021)
  Juraj Jarábek (11 June 2021 - 31 May 2022) 
  Eduard Pagáč (1 July 2022 -)

References

External links 
Official club site 
City of Sereď portal 

 
Football clubs in Slovakia
Association football clubs established in 1914
1914 establishments in Slovakia
Sport in Trnava Region